Phage is the shortened form of bacteriophage, a virus that infects bacteria.

Phage may also refer to:
 "Phage" (Star Trek: Voyager), an episode of Star Trek: Voyager
 Phage (comics), a supervillain from the Spider-Man comic books
 Phages (EP), an EP by the Most Serene Republic
 Phages, fictional monsters in Shadow Galactica group of characters in Sailor Moon
 Phages, fictional genetically-engineered humans in Dances on the Snow

See also
Fage (disambiguation)
Macrophage, a large phagocyte that originates from a monocyte  
Page (disambiguation)
Phagocyte, a cell that ingests foreign cells, viruses, and debris